Louis Niesten (1844–1920) was a Belgian astronomer working at the Brussels Royal Observatory. In 1877 he observed Mars and created a detailed map of its surface features.

He organized an expedition to Santiago de Chile to observe the Venus transit the Sun in 1882. A second Belgian expedition (led by Jean-Charles Houzeau) travelled to San Antonio, Texas to determine the planet's parallax during the same transit. Both parties used a specially designed heliometer for this purpose.

A crater on Mars was named in his honor.

External links
Description of the 1882 transit of Venus expeditions
Mars globe presented by Louis Niesten to the Royal Astronomical Society

1844 births
1920 deaths
19th-century Belgian astronomers